Andrew Maloney (born 2 June 1990) is a New Zealand professional sailor born on 2 June 1990.

Sailing career
From the Murrays Bay Sailing Club, he finished third in both the 2005 and 2006 World Championships in the Splash class.

He finished 13th in the 2011 ISAF Sailing World Championships in a Laser, he then finished third at the 2012 Laser World Championships. He also sailed for Oman Sail in the 2012 Extreme Sailing Series. At the 2013 America's Cup, Maloney was part of the New Zealand team that won the Youth America's Cup, sailing alongside Peter Burling, Blair Tuke and Guy Endean.

He attempted to qualify for the 2016 Summer Olympics in the Laser class, but missed out on a spot in the New Zealand Olympic team to eventual bronze medallist, Sam Meech. His sister, Alex Maloney, is a professional sailor who won Silver at the 2016 Summer Olympics in a 49erFX with Sam Meech's sister, Molly.

Maloney joined Team New Zealand in November 2016. He added  in muscle to bulk up for a grinding role on the boat. The role turned out to be as a "cyclor", after Team New Zealand decided to install pedal powered grinders. Maloney was part of the crew that won the 2017 America's Cup.

References

External Links
 
 Andy Maloney at Team New Zealand
 Andy Maloney at Yachting New Zealand

1990 births
Living people
New Zealand male sailors (sport)
Team New Zealand sailors
Extreme Sailing Series sailors
2017 America's Cup sailors
2021 America's Cup sailors
Finn class world champions
World champions in sailing for New Zealand
Finn class sailors
Laser class sailors
420 class sailors